Svenska Supercupen was a one-off fixture in Swedish football played between the previous season's Damallsvenskan champions and winners of the Svenska Cupen. The fixture was played before the start of Damallsvenskan. The first final was played in 2007.

In 2014 no Supercup was held, as the Swedish Cup was restructured going from single years to being played summer to summer.

Previous winners
Previous winners are:

In 2007 Umea won the league and the cup thus playing against league runners-up Djurgarden in the 2008 supercup.

Ch  League champion.
Cw  Cup winner

References

External links
 Svenska Supercupen at svenskfotboll.se
 Cup at soccerway.com

Super
National women's association football supercups
Football cup competitions in Sweden
2007 establishments in Sweden
Recurring sporting events established in 2007

Defunct national association football supercups
Defunct football competitions in Sweden